The 1922 Princeton Tigers football team was an American football team that represented Princeton University as an independent during the 1922 college football season. In their ninth season under head coach Bill Roper, the Tigers compiled a perfect 8–0 record, shut out five of eight opponents, and outscored all opponents by a total of 127 to 34. Mel Dickenson was the team captain.

There was no contemporaneous system in 1922 for determining a national champion. However, Princeton was retroactively named as the national champion by the Boand System and College Football Researchers Association, and as a co-national champion by the National Championship Foundation, Parke H. Davis, and Jeff Sagarin (using the ELO-Chess methodology). California and Cornell were recognized by some selectors as the national champion or co-champion.

Princeton tackle Herb Treat was a consensus first-team player on the 1922 All-America team. Other notable players on the 1922 team included end Howdy Gray, halfback Jack Cleaves, tackle Harland "Pink" Baker, and guard Mel Dickinson.

Schedule

References

Princeton
Princeton Tigers football seasons
College football national champions
College football undefeated seasons
Princeton Tigers football